New York State Route 116 (NY 116) is an east–west state highway in Westchester County, New York, in the United States. As it heads east, NY 116 connects to Interstate 684 (I-684) and has an overlap with NY 121. NY 116 originally extended as far west as Peekskill when it was assigned as part of the 1930 renumbering of state highways in New York. It was cut back to its current length in the late 1930s.

Route description

NY 116 begins at an intersection with US 202 (North Somerstown Road) in the hamlet of Somers, a couple blocks east of the northern terminus of NY 100. The route proceeds east for one block through a mixed-use area as Somerstown Road, a two-lane street, before bending southeast and changing names to Purdys Road as it leaves the community. Outside of Somers, the businesses give way to residences comprising the hamlet of Lake Purdy, a large residential community off the main roadway. At Lake Purdy, the road turns to take a more easterly track into the town of North Salem, where it crosses the Croton River and passes into the hamlet of Purdys. As NY 116 heads toward the community's center, it crosses over the Metro-North Railroad's Harlem Line and serves the hamlet's Metro-North station.

After crossing over the tracks, NY 116 immediately intersects with I-684 at its exit 7 and meets with NY 22, which closely follows I-684 through northern Westchester County. NY 116 turns north at the latter junction, overlapping with NY 22 for two blocks across the Titicus River before splitting off to the east on Titicus Road. The route loosely parallels the river to the western end of the nearby Titicus Reservoir, located to the south of NY 116. The highway runs east along the northern shore of the reservoir, bowing slightly to the north as it passes several mansions overlooking the water. Past the reservoir, NY 116 enters the hamlet of Salem Center, a community adjacent to the route's junction with June Road (unsigned County Route 310 or CR 310).

Outside of Salem Center, NY 116 heads into less developed, mostly wooded areas of the town of North Salem. Not far from June Road, NY 116 meets and becomes concurrent with NY 121 (Grant Road), which takes on the Titicus Road name. In North Salem itself, NY 121 turns north to follow Peach Lake Road while NY 116 bends to follow a more southeasterly track. NY 116 quickly leaves the hamlet, passing through wooded, sparsely populated sections of the town to reach the Connecticut state line. The highway passes a large farm as it crosses the state line and continues into the town of Ridgefield as that state's Route 116.

History

NY 116 was originally a much longer route when it was assigned as part of the 1930 renumbering of state highways in New York. At the time, it began in Peekskill and followed modern US 202 east to Somers, from where it continued east over its current alignment to the Connecticut state line. In 1934, US 202 was designated and overlapped with NY 116 from Peekskill to Somers. The overlap was eliminated  when NY 116 was truncated to its current western terminus in Somers.

Major intersections

See also

References

External links

116
Transportation in Westchester County, New York